BAHS may refer to:
 Bad Axe High School, Bad Axe, Michigan, United States
 Boyd H. Anderson High School, Lauderdale Lakes, Florida, United States
 Bishop Anstey High School, Port of Spain, Trinidad and Tobago
 Broken Arrow Senior High School, Broken Arrow, Oklahoma, United States
 Brownsville Area High School, Brownsville, Pennsylvania, United States
 Bryan Adams High School, Dallas, Texas, United States
 Burnsville Alternative High School, Eagan, Minnesota, United States
 Beaver Area High School, Beaver, Pennsylvania, United States
 Berlin American High School, Berlin, Germany